Almighty Love is the sixth studio album by the Irish singer-songwriter Damien Dempsey. Four years in the making, the album once again features Dempsey with long-time producer John Reynolds with Sinéad O'Connor again providing backing vocals on several tracks.

Almighty Love was released on 28 September 2012, along with the title track as the first single. The album sees Dempsey continue his exploration of local Irish themes, but with a greater focus on wider themes such as love, peace and justice.

Track listing 
The album Almighty Love contains eleven tracks and is sixty-two minutes in length.

A Deluxe Edition was also released, which included acoustic versions of Almighty Love, Community and Bustin Outta Here.

Credits
All music and lyrics by Damien Dempsey apart from track 6 written by Andy M. Stewart and the poem on track 4 written by Kae Tempest.
 Damien Dempsey – acoustic and electric guitars, piano
 John Reynolds – piano, keyboards, drums
 Sinéad O'Connor – backing vocals
 Kae Tempest – rap on track 4
 Clare Kenny – bass
 Caroline Dale – cello
 Seán Regan – fiddle, viola
 John McLoughlin – mandolin, guitars
 Julian Wilson – keyboards, piano, hammond

References

2005 albums
Damien Dempsey albums

ga:Shots (albam)